Lucas Bastián Alarcón Ancapi (born 5 March 2000) is a Chilean footballer who plays as a defender for Chilean Primera División side Deportes La Serena on loan from Universidad de Chile.

International career
At early age, he represented Chile at under-15 level at the 2015 South American U-15 Championship and Chile U17 at two friendly matches against USA U17, at the 2017 South American U-17 Championship – Chile was the runner-up – and at the 2017 FIFA U-17 World Cup. Also, he played all the matches for Chile U17 at the friendly tournament Lafarge Foot Avenir 2017 in France, better known as Tournament Limoges, where Chile became champion after defeating Belgium U18 and Poland U18 and drawing France U18. 

On 2019, he represented Chile U20 at the 2019 South American U-20 Championship and played four matches for Chile U23 at the 2019 Maurice Revello Tournament.

Career statistics

Club

Notes

Honours

International
Chile U17
Tournoi de Limoges: 2017

References

External links

2000 births
Living people
People from Puente Alto
Chilean people of Mapuche descent
Mapuche sportspeople
Indigenous sportspeople of the Americas
Chilean footballers
Chile youth international footballers
Chile under-20 international footballers
Association football defenders
Chilean Primera División players
Primera B de Chile players
Universidad de Chile footballers
Deportes Valdivia footballers
Deportes La Serena footballers
Footballers from Santiago